Scott McEachin (born December 12, 1951) is an American politician who served in the Oklahoma House of Representatives from the 67th district from 2016 to 2018.

References

1951 births
Living people
Republican Party members of the Oklahoma House of Representatives